Adam Zwar (born 13 January 1972) is an Australian actor, voice artist, and writer. He is best known for co-creating the Australian comedy series Squinters, Lowdown, Wilfred and creating the critically acclaimed Channel 10 comedy Mr. Black as well as the popular factual series Agony Aunts, Agony Uncles, The Agony of Life, The Agony of Modern Manners and Agony. Zwar also presented and produced seminal cricket documentaries Underarm: The Ball That Changed Cricket and Bodyline: The Ultimate Test which took a forensic look at the infamous 1932-33 Ashes series between Australia and England.

Early life
Zwar was born on 13 January 1972 in Cairns, Queensland where he was subsequently raised.  His parents bought the family home from actor Leo McKern. Zwar is the son of author Desmond Zwar, who wrote the best-selling book The Loneliest Man in the World about Rudolf Hess. Zwar's mother Delphine was a longtime writer for the House and Garden magazine.

From the age of thirteen, Zwar attended Smithfield High School and Brisbane Grammar School where he captained the cross country team in his senior year. After high school, he completed a journalism degree at the University of Southern Queensland in Toowoomba. He subsequently began studying acting as well. He undertook a journalism cadetship at The Cairns Post, and subsequently moved to Melbourne to work for the Sunday Herald Sun.

After some time working at the Sunday Herald Sun, Zwar decided to pursue his interest in the film industry. In 1997 he left his full-time journalism job to work two jobs as a freelance journalist and freelance actor. He performed in theatre, numerous television commercials, as well as guest roles in Neighbours, Blue Heelers and Sea Change. Each year Zwar would save a portion of his income (usually around $A4000) and use it to produce a short film.

Career
After guest appearances in several Australian television shows in the late 1990s, Adam co-wrote, produced and co-starred in the short film Wilfred in 2002 and then went on to co-create and co-star in the television series, Wilfred, screened on SBS in 2007. Later that year, he won the AFI Award for Best Performance in a Television Comedy. After a second season on Wilfred, Adam collaborated with Amanda Brotchie, to create the popular comedy, Lowdown, which went on to win Best Television Comedy Screenplay at the Australian Writers Guild Awards (AWGIES) in 2010 and 2012. Lowdown would also win Best Television Comedy at the 2013 AACTA Awards.

More recently, he has created the successful Agony series for ABC1, featuring some of Australia's funniest and brightest comedians and social commentators. In 2012, Agony Uncles premiered, followed by Agony Aunts, The Agony of Life, The Agony of Christmas and then in 2014 The Agony of Modern Manners and The Agony of the Mind. In 2015, the series returned with Agony. Agony Aunts won Best Light Entertainment Television Series at the 2013 AACTA Awards.

Adam also co-wrote and co-starred in the movie Rats and Cats, which premiered to sell-out audiences and critical acclaim at the 2006 Melbourne International Film Festival and went on to screen at the SXSW Film Festival in 2009. From 2006 to 2010, he was head writer on the AFI Awards screened on the Nine Network, working alongside hosts Geoffrey Rush and Stephen Curry. Zwar's other acting credits include playing Martin Gero in Series 1 of 2 of the Network Ten crime drama Rush, as well as the SBS series Carla Cametti PD, the ABC television movie Valentine's Day, the crime drama Underbelly for Channel Nine. In 2016, Zwar joined the main cast of Foxtel's drama Top of the Lake.

Zwar's other screen-acting credits include both seasons of the Network Ten sketch comedy series The Wedge, Blue Heelers, Stingers, CrashBurn, SeaChange, BackBerner, Foxtel's drama Tangle and MDA. His stage-acting credits include Kissing for Australia, for which he received a Green Room Award nomination, and Cyrano de Bergerac for the Melbourne Theatre Company.

He has also written the plays Kissing for Australia, Primrose Hill, The Inner Sanctum, and The Fall and Fall of Jeremy Hawthorn

Zwar is one of Australia's leading voice-over artists lending his voice to Ford, Australia Post, ISelect, the Herald Sun, Honda, HBA, Boag's, RACV, Bundaberg Rum, AHM and Blackmores.

Personal life
Zwar is married to Amanda Brotchie, the AFI award-winning filmmaker.

Writing credits

Acting credits

Television

Film

Awards and nominations
AACTA: Won with Amanda Brotchie and Nicole Minchin Best Television Comedy for Lowdown (2012).
AACTA: Won with Nicole Minchin Best Light Entertainment for Agony Aunts (2012).
AWGIE (Australian Writers Guild) Award: Won with Amanda Brotchie and Trudy Hellier Best Comedy – Situation or Narrative for Lowdown (2012) Episode 3 – "One Fine Gay"
Australian Film Institute Awards (Television): Won with Jason Gann Best Screenplay in Television Wilfred (2007)
AWGIE (Australian Writers Guild) Award: Won with Amanda Brotchie Best Comedy – Situation or Narrative for Lowdown (2010) Episode 7 – "Who's Your Baddy?"
AWGIE (Australian Writers Guild) Award: Nominated for Best Comedy – Situation or Narrative for Wilfred (2007) Episode 6 – "Dog Eat Dog" Wilfred (2007)
Australian Film Institute Awards (Television): Won Best Actor in a Television Comedy Wilfred (2007)
 The Green Room Awards (Theatre): Nominated for Best Actor – Kissing for Australia
Accolade Competition: Award for Excellence in Comedy – Lowdown
Accolade Competition: Award for Excellence for Leading Actor – Lowdown

Works
 Twelve Summers (2021)

References

External links
 
 

1972 births
Living people
Australian stand-up comedians
Australian male voice actors
Australian screenwriters
Australian male film actors
Australian male television actors
University of Southern Queensland alumni
21st-century Australian male actors